Jonathan Galassi (born 1949 in Seattle, Washington) has served as the president and publisher of Farrar, Straus and Giroux and is currently the Chairman and Executive Editor.

Early life 
Galassi was born in Seattle (his father worked as an attorney for the Justice Department), but he grew up in Plympton, Massachusetts. He attended Phillips Exeter Academy, where he became interested in poetry, writing and literature. He attended Harvard College, where he studied English with instructors including Robert Lowell and Elizabeth Bishop, and served as an editor of the Harvard Lampoon and the president of the Harvard Advocate. He graduated in 1971, then became a Marshall Scholar at Christ's College, Cambridge. He realized while attending Christ’s College that he wanted a career in book publishing.

Career 
Galassi began his publishing career as an editorial intern at Houghton Mifflin in Boston in 1973. He moved to Random House in New York, and then in 1986 to Farrar, Straus & Giroux (FSG), after being fired from Random House. Two years later, he was named editor-in-chief, and served as the president and publisher at FSG until 2018. He was succeeded as Publisher by Mitzi Angel in 2018, and Angel was named President in 2021. Galassi is currently the Chairman and Executive Editor.

Galassi is also a translator of poetry and a poet himself. He has translated and published the poetic works of the Italian poets Giacomo Leopardi and Eugenio Montale. His honors as a poet include a 1989 Guggenheim Fellowship, and his activities include having been poetry editor for The Paris Review for ten years, and being an honorary chairman of the Academy of American Poets. He has published poems in literary journals and magazines including Threepenny Review, The New Yorker, The Nation and the Poetry Foundation website.

He is also a trustee at his alma mater Exeter.

Personal life 
Galassi lives in Brooklyn. He was married to Susan Grace, with whom he has two daughters. The couple divorced in late 2011. He is gay.

Bibliography

Poetry

Collections
 Morning Run: Poems (Paris Review Editions/British American Pub., 1988)
 North Street: Poems (HarperCollins Publishers, 2000)

Translations
 The Second Life of Art: Selected Essays of Eugenio Montale (Ecco Press, 1982)
 Otherwise: Last and First Poems of Eugenio Montale (Vintage Books, 1984)
 Collected poems, 1920-1954: Eugenio Montale (Farrar, Straus & Giroux, 1998)
 A Boy Named Giotto by Paolo Guarnieri (pictures by Bimba Landmann; Farrar, Straus & Giroux, 1999)
 Selected Poems of Eugenio Montale (translated by Jonathan Galassi, Charles Wright, and David Young; edited with an introduction by David Young; Oberlin College Press, 2004)
 Canti by Giacomo Leopardi (translated and annotated by Jonathan Galassi; Farrar, Straus & Giroux, 2010)

List of poems

Novels
 Muse (Knopf, 2015)
 School Days: a Novel (Other Press, 2022)

Sources
 Library of Congress Online Catalog > Jonathan Galassi

References

External links
 Video Interview: Charlie Rose > February 19, 1999 > A Conversation with Editor Jonathan Galassi
 Interview: Poets & Writers > July 1, 2009 > Agents & Editors: A Q&A with Jonathan Galassi by Jofie Ferrari-Adler
 Poem: The Nation > September 27, 2000 > Bequest by Jonathan Galassi
 Poem: The New Yorker > April 20, 2009 > Lunch Poem for F.S. by Jonathan Galassi
 Poems: The Poetry Foundation > Girlhood, Flow, May, Montale's Grave, North of Childhood, Saving Minutes, Thread and Turning Forty by Jonathan Galassi
 Review: A Review by Cynthia Haven of North Street by Jonathan Galassi
 Jonathan Galassi Papers. Yale Collection of American Literature, Beinecke Rare Book and Manuscript Library, Yale University.

1949 births
Living people
American publishers (people)
American male poets
American translators
American book editors
Harvard College alumni
Marshall Scholars
Alumni of Christ's College, Cambridge
Writers from Seattle
Poets from New York (state)
The New Yorker people
American LGBT poets
Harvard Advocate alumni
The Harvard Lampoon alumni
Phillips Exeter Academy alumni